The 1998 Winter Olympics, officially known as the  and commonly known as Nagano 1998, was a winter multi-sport event held from 7 to 22 February 1998, mainly in Nagano, Japan, with some events taking place in the nearby mountain communities of Hakuba, Karuizawa, Nozawa Onsen, and Yamanouchi. The city of Nagano had previously been a candidate to host the 1940 Winter Olympics (which were later cancelled), as well as the 1972 Winter Olympics, but had been eliminated at the national level by Sapporo on both occasions.

The games hosted 2,176 athletes from 72 nations competing in 7 sports and 68 events. The number of athletes and participating nations were a record at the time. The Games saw the introduction of women's ice hockey, curling and snowboarding. National Hockey League players were allowed to participate in the men's ice hockey for the first time. Azerbaijan, Kenya, Macedonia, Uruguay, and Venezuela made their debut at the Winter Olympics.

The athlete who won the most medals at these games was the Russian cross-country skier Larisa Lazutina who won five medals, including three gold. The Norwegian cross-country skier Bjørn Dæhlie won four medals, including three gold, which took his total Olympic medal total to 12, including eight gold, which is a record for Winter Olympics. Czech men's ice hockey team won the gold medal. In Ski Jumping, Kazuyoshi Funaki won two gold medals and one silver for host Japan. The American Figure skater Tara Lipinski became the youngest champion in Olympic history at the age of 15 years and 255 days. Germany dominated the medal table with 29 medals, including 12 gold. Germany was followed by Norway and Russia, who won 25 and 18 medals respectively. Canada, which finished fourth in the medal table with 15 medals, including six gold, had its most successful Winter Olympics up until that point.

The host was selected on 15 June 1991, over Salt Lake City, Östersund, Jaca and Aosta. They were the third Olympic Games and second Winter Olympics to be held in Japan, after the 1964 Summer Olympics in Tokyo and the 1972 Winter Olympics in Sapporo. The games were succeeded by the 1998 Winter Paralympics from 5 to 14 March. These were the final Winter Olympic Games under the IOC Presidency of Juan Antonio Samaranch.

The hosting of the games improved transportation networks with the construction of the high-speed Shinkansen, the Nagano Shinkansen, now the Hokuriku Shinkansen, between Tokyo and Nagano Station, via Ōmiya and Takasaki. In addition, new highways were built, including the Nagano Expressway and the Jōshin-etsu Expressway and upgrades were made to existing roads.

Host city selection

In 1932, Japan won the rights to host the 1940 Summer Olympics in Tokyo. At that time, organizers of the Summer Olympics had priority in choosing the venue for the Winter Olympics the same year. Several Japanese cities, including Nagano, prepared a bid. Sapporo was chosen; however, the games never took place because of World War II. In 1961, Nagano declared its intention to host the 1968 Winter Olympics but lost to Sapporo, the winning Japanese bid, who lost to Grenoble, France, and Sapporo eventually won the right to host the 1972 Winter Olympics.

Japanese private sector organizations, in 1983, began publicly discussing a possible bid. Two years later, in 1985, the Nagano Prefectural Assembly, decided to begin the process to bid, for its third time, for a Winter Olympics. The bid committee was established in July 1986, they submitted their bid to the Japanese Olympic Committee (JOC) in November of the same year. Other Japanese cities that were bidding were Asahikawa, Yamagata, and Morioka. 1 June 1988, the JOC selected Nagano in the first round of national voting, receiving 34 of 45 votes. In 1989, the bid committee was reorganized, with the Japanese Prime Minister as head of the committee. The number of committee members was 511.

On 12 February 1990, the bid delegation presented its candidature at the International Olympic Committee in Lausanne before Juan Antonio Samaranch. Other candidate cities for the 1998 Olympics were Aosta, Italy; Jaca, Spain; Östersund, Sweden; Salt Lake City, United States, and Sochi, Soviet Union (now Russia). The host city selection was held in Birmingham, United Kingdom, on 15 June 1991, at the 97th IOC session. After the first round of voting, Nagano led, with Aosta and Salt Lake City tied for last. Aosta was eliminated in a run-off against Salt Lake City. After the second round of voting, Nagano led with Salt Lake City in second, and Jaca was eliminated. Following round 3, Nagano continued to lead, with Salt Lake City in second, and Östersund was eliminated. Finally, Nagano prevailed over Salt Lake City by just 4 votes in the fifth round of voting, becoming the third Japanese city to host the games after Tokyo in 1964 Summer Olympics and Sapporo in 1972. Nagano, at 36°N, is the southernmost city in the Northern hemisphere to host the Winter Olympics (1960 Winter Olympics host Squaw Valley, California is 39°N). In June 1995, Salt Lake was chosen as the host of the following 2002 Winter Olympics.

Following a 2002 Winter Olympic bid scandal that occurred in the summer of 2000, Atlanta, host of the 1996 Summer Olympics, Nagano, and Sydney, host of the 2000 Summer Olympics, were suspected of similar improprieties in bidding practices. Although nothing illegal was ever done, gifts to IOC members were considered morally dubious. The Nagano Olympic bid committee spent approximately $14 million to entertain the 62 International Olympic Committee members and many of their companions. The precise figures are unknown since Nagano, after the IOC asked that the entertainment expenditures not be made public, destroyed the financial records, according to bid member Junichi Yamaguchi.

Organization

Five months after the city was selected, the Nagano Olympic Organizing Committee (NAOC) was created. Eishiro Saito, Chairman of Japan Business Federation (Keidanren) was selected as president of the committee. There were four Vice Presidents: Goro Yoshimura, the Governor of Nagano Prefecture; Hironoshin Furuhashi, president of the Japanese Olympic Committee; Yoshiaki Tsutsumi, the president of the Ski Association of Japan; and Tasuku Tsukada, the Mayor of Nagano City. In addition, the Vice Minister of the Ministry of Home Affairs, Tadashi Tsuda, served as director-general. Tsuda was replaced by Makoto Kobayashi in 1993.

The organizing committee recognized three goals for the games, which they referred to as "Games from the Heart": promote youth participation, coexistence with nature, create a festival with peace and friendship at its centre. To realize the first goal, a camp bringing together 217 young people from 51 countries was created, along with the program of "One school, one country" in Nagano Prefecture. This program organized cultural exchanges with other countries. In addition, more than 100,000 tickets were reserved for children. For the second point, the organizers attempted to minimize the impact on their nature and the local ecosystem. Regarding the third point, an international truce organized by the United Nations in 1997 was adopted during the games.

In June 1998, four months after the Games, the NAOC presented a donation of US$1 million to the Olympic Museum in Lausanne. This value come of the revenue of tickets sales and another actions from the committee. In October of the same year, NAOC also donated the 3-D high vision theater system that was inside the Olympic Village to the Olympic Museum.

In February 1999, one year after the Games, the IOC awarded the Nagano the Olympic Cup, and presented the city a replica of the sculpture of stylized athletes raising the Olympic Flag by the Swiss artist Nag Arnoldi.

Economic aspects

The costs of construction and of the land of the Olympic venues totaled ¥106.6 billion, approximately 914 million US dollars. Of this, the Japanese national government spent ¥51.1 billion, the Nagano prefectural government spent ¥29.6 billion, and the cities and towns of Nagano, ¥23.4 billion; Hakuba, ¥1 billion; and Nozawa Onsen, ¥1.1 billion; shared the remaining ¥25.5 billion. The most expensive venue was impressive M-Wave, the indoor rink which hosted the long-track speed skating events. It cost near ¥34.8 billion. The two ice hockey venues, Big Hat and Aqua Wing Arena cost ¥19.1 and ¥9.1 billion respectively. The White Ring (arena), which hosted figure skating and short-track speed skating cost ¥14.2 billion, the Spiral, which hosted bobsleigh, luge, and skeleton, cost ¥10.1 billion. Another ¥8.6 billion was spent on the Hakuba Ski Jumping Stadium, ¥7 billion for Snow Harp – the cross-country skiing venue, and ¥3 billion for the biathlon venue at Nozawa Onsen Snow Resort.

The organizing committee financed all costs, totaling ¥113.9 billion. It spent ¥99.4 billion for operational expenses, ¥21.6 billion for public relations, ¥20.7 billion for installations, ¥18.4 billion for telecommunications, ¥15.9 billion for running the competitions, and ¥14.4 billion for administration. Television rights were worth ¥35.4 billion, and marketing earned ¥31.3 billion. Ticket sales were worth ¥10.5 billion. The total cost of the Nagano Games is estimated to have been US$15.25 billion (in 2015), of which the largest factor in the cost of the games was the extension of the shinkansen to Nagano. This compares, for example, with US$2.5 billion for the 2002 Winter Olympics, US$4.35 billion for the 2006 Winter Olympics, US$7.56 billion for the 2010 Winter Olympics, and US$51 billion for the 2014 Winter Olympics

Transportation

Nagano is situated at the Japanese Alps area and receives large snowfalls every year. These combined to make transportation an important challenge for the organizing committee. In addition, the Olympic Village was a distance of 7 kilometers from the center of the city, and sporting events were spread over five surrounding cities. The complicating matters were that many of the venues had one single road in-out, which limited possibilities and led to traffic jams.

To improve access to Nagano, the government decided to link the prefecture with the high-speed shinkansen train network. Called Nagano Shinkansen, (now the Hokuriku Shinkansen), was inaugurated five months before the start of the Games. This reduced by half the travel time between Tokyo and Nagano, to 79 minutes for 221 kilometers. The length of the track between Takasaki Station and Nagano Station is 125.7 km, which includes 63.4 km of tunnels. The high speed train network carried 655,000 passengers during the Games.

Two highways, the Nagano Expressway and the Jōshin-etsu Expressway, were also built in the Nagano region. In May 1993, the 75.8-kilometer section of the Nagano Expressway was completed, and in October 1997, the 111.4 kilometer section of the Jōshin-etsu Expressway was completed. In addition, another 114.9 kilometers of roads within Nagano Prefecture were improved.

Transportation systems for the Games ran for 33 days, from the opening of the Athletes Village until 3 days after the Paralympics closing ceremony. Approximately 64% of the athletes arrived between 1 and 6 February, and 74% left Nagano between 22 and 25 February. Transportation operations were directed from a transportation centre situated at the same building of the organizing committee. Two regional transportation hubs were created in Hakuba and Yamanouchi, as well as a traffic center for vehicles in Karuizawa. The media, as well as representatives of different national Olympic committees generally were transported by car, from their arrival airport, that was the Narita International Airport, but some delegations arrived by Kansai International Airport and Chubu Centrair International Airport in Nagoya, to the three Olympic Villages. The members of the IOC traveled by Shinkansen.

To improve transportation for spectators, the number and hours of local trains were extended. During the heaviest traffic days, more cars were put in service and up to 68 parking areas, for 8,000 vehicles were at available for various Olympic delegations, and another 17 parking areas for 23,000 cars for spectators. Approximately 1,200 vehicles had navigation systems which transmitted their locations in real time.

As one of the principal aims of the Games was to respect nature, many vehicles were considered ecological or semi-ecological. In addition, there were more than 100 electric vehicles, hybrid mini-buses and other environmentally-friendly vehicles.

Marketing

The emblem of the 1998 Winter Olympics consisted of a stylized snow flower with each petal representing an athlete participating in a winter sport. The figure could also represent a snowflake, or a mountain flower, which refers to the importance of the natural environment to the city of Nagano. Similarly, Tokyo used cherry blossoms in its logo for its candidature for the 2020 Summer Olympics.

Landor Associates conceived the official mascots that were used by the communication team for the Games. They consisted of four owlets, Sukki, Nokki, Lekki and Tsukki, also called Snowlets. The names were chosen from more than 47,000 suggestions. Four represents the number of years between each Olympic Games, and also represent the four elements, fire, air, earth, and water.

The official poster for the Games was designed by the graphic designer Masuteru Aoba presented a thrush perched on ski poles with light in the background shining on snow-capped mountain peaks. Here, as with the emblem and the mascots, the importance of the natural environment in these Olympic Games and a desire to create harmony between athletes and the natural surroundings are shown. In addition to the official poster, a separate poster was created for the opening ceremony. Marketing for the games cost the organizing committee 5.9 billion yen.

These Olympic Games were sponsored by 11 worldwide partners, 8 gold partners, and 18 official supports and suppliers. Marketing revenues for sponsoring or for the rights to use the emblems and mascots of the Games totaled 31.3 billion yen.

Mascots

Sukki, Nokki, Lekki and Tsukki, also known as the Snowlets, are the 1998 Winter Olympic mascots and are four snowy owls. They represent respectively fire (Sukki), air (Nokki), earth (Lekki) and water (Tsukki) and together they represent the four major islands of Japan.

Sponsors of the 1998 Winter Olympics
The development of Rights Packages were based on International Olympic Committee policy of offering exclusive rights to a limited number of companies, with one company allowed to purchase the rights for any single product or service category, and these were based on previous Games, with adaptations for the local market. Sponsors were permitted to use the emblem and mascots as long as consent was obtained from the International Olympic Committee, Japanese Olympic Committee, and the NAOC. Hospitality packages for sponsors included priority for accommodations, tickets, and transportation services. The Sponsor Hospitality Village, next to the Nagano Olympic Stadium, welcomed 32,000 guests.

To promote awareness of the sponsors, advertising was done in various media from 1995, and on banners and buses immediately before the games. Dick Pound noted, during the Games, the excellence of the marketing program, citing the "perfect example of how the private and public sectors can work together".

The Games had 11 Worldwide Olympic Partners, eight Gold Sponsors and 18 Official Supporters and Suppliers.

Worldwide Olympic Partners:

The Coca-Cola Company
IBM
John Hancock Financial
Kodak
McDonald's
Panasonic
Samsung Electronics
Time Inc.
United Parcel Service
Visa Inc.
Xerox (Fuji Xerox)

Gold Sponsors:

Amway
 Hachijuni Bank
KDDI
Kirin Company
Mizuno Corporation
Nippon Telegraph and Telephone
Seiko
Toyota

Official Supporters and Suppliers:

Bridgestone
Brother Industries
Corona Corp.
 Hanamaruki Foods
Hitachi Zosen Corporation
Idemitsu Kosan
Japan Agricultural Cooperatives
Japan Airlines
 KOKUYO
 MAYEKAWA
 Marudai Foods
Oji Paper Company
 Pia Corporation
 Sankosya Corporation
Snow Brand Milk Products
Tokio Marine
Tokyo Gas
Yamazaki Baking

Ticket sales
From 7 February 1997, the organizing committee put up for sale 1,286,000 tickets for the various competitions and ceremonies. The number of tickets sold was 1,149,615, which represented 89.4% of available tickets. Including people connected to the Games, the total number of spectators was 1,275,529. This number was slightly higher than in 1994 but slightly lower than the 1988 Winter Olympics in Calgary. Tickets sales were a success in Japan with a reservation list of 6 million. For the most popular sports, a lottery was used. In total, ticket sales raised 10.5 billion yen for the organizing committee.

The ice hockey matches represented 295,802 tickets sold, 26% of the total. Tickets sold for alpine skiing totaled 166,092; for ski jumping, 96,000, and speed skating, 93,000. For multiple sports, ski jumping, Nordic combined jumps, freestyle skiing, all three skating disciplines, bobsleigh, and curling, as well as the ceremonies, all tickets were sold. By contrast, only 56.6% of the 146,000 available tickets for cross-country skiing were sold.

Cost and cost overrun
The Oxford Olympics Study established the outturn cost of the Nagano 1998 Winter Olympics at US$2.2 billion in 2015-dollars and cost overrun at 56% in real terms. This includes sports-related costs only, that is, (i) operational costs incurred by the organizing committee for the purpose of staging the Games, e.g., expenditures for technology, transportation, workforce, administration, security, catering, ceremonies, and medical services, and (ii) direct capital costs incurred by the host city and country or private investors to build, e.g., the competition venues, the Olympic village, international broadcast center, and media and press center, which are required to host the Games. Indirect capital costs are not included, such as for road, rail, or airport infrastructure, or for hotel upgrades or other business investment incurred in preparation for the Games but not directly related to staging the Games. The cost and cost overrun for Nagano 1998 compares with costs of US$2.5 billion and a cost overrun of 13% for Vancouver 2010, and costs of US$51 billion and a cost overrun of 289% for Sochi 2014, the latter being the most costly Olympics to date. Average cost for Winter Games since 1960 is US$3.1 billion, average cost overrun is 142%.

Venues

Sport sites
For the 1998 Winter Olympics in Nagano, Japan, a total of fourteen sports venues, all within Nagano Prefecture, were used. Construction of these venues, and of the Olympic Stadium which hosted the ceremonies, began in 1990 and lasted until 1997, with construction and land costs totaling 106.6 billion yen. The most expensive venue constructed for the games was the long-track speed skating venue, M-Wave built 5 kilometers from Nagano Station. Between March 1996 and November 1997, these sites were tested with 16 different world champion events, world cups, and other international competitions to allow the organizers to prepare for the running of the Games.

Five sites, all constructed for the Games, are located in the city of Nagano. Minami Nagano Sports Park, built to serve as a baseball park, was constructed in the south section of the city, near Shinonoi Station, and approximately 9 kilometers from Nagano Station. The stadium, which held the opening and closing ceremonies, resembles a cherry blossom, a symbol of Japan. The stadium can accommodate 50,000 with temporary stands added, but usually accommodates 35,000 spectators. Big Hat, named for its shape, was the principal site of ice hockey. Big Hat, located approximately 2 kilometers from Nagano Station, has a capacity of 10,104 spectators. Aqua Wing Arena was the second ice hockey arena at the Games. Shaped like a wing, it had a capacity of 6000 during the Olympics. After the Games, it was modified into an interior swimming pool. Aqua Wing is approximately 5 kilometers from Nagano Station. Its closest stations are Kita-Nagano Station and Asahi Station. M-Wave, used for speed skating, is the first indoor, long-track speed skating venue in Japan. It was built to accommodate 10,000 spectators. The venue, which gets its name from its M-shape, representing the surrounding mountains, is approximately 5 kilometers from Nagano Station. Finally, White Ring, with a maximum capacity of 7,351 spectators, was built for figure skating and short track speed skating. White Ring, which is used as a public gymnasium, is approximately 6 kilometers from Nagano Station.

Hakuba village is situated 50 kilometers west of the city of Nagano. Hakuba hosted three Olympics sites. Alpine skiing's Downhill, Super G and Combined were situated at Happo'one Resort. Three courses between altitudes of 840 meters and 1,765 meters were used, one for the men's, women's and Combined for both men's and women's. The site has a capacity of 20,000 spectators. Hakuba Ski Jumping Stadium was the first ski jump built in Japan with parallel 90 and 120 K-point hills. The ski jumping stadium can accommodate 45,000 spectators. Snow Harp Kamishiro was built for cross country skiing and Nordic combined. It includes three tracks of 4.8, 4.8, and 7.8 kilometers, 6 meters wide. The stadium is another 1.2 kilometers. In total, Snow Harp has 19 kilometers of tracks. Up to 20,000 spectators can be accommodated.

Nozawa Onsen Ski Resort, in the town of Nozawaonsen, was site of biathlon. Nozawa is approximately 50 kilometers north of Nagano. At Nozawa Onsen, the stadium was built around six existing tracks. Two tracks, of 4 kilometers and 7 kilometers, were used for the Games. The stadium can accommodate 20,000 spectators.

Two sites in the town of Yamanouchi, approximately 30 kilometers northeast of Nagano, were used. Giant Slalom was held at Mount Yakebitai at Shiga Kogen Resort, at an altitude between 1,530 and 1,969 meters. The site can accommodate 20,000 spectators. Also in Shiga Kogen, at Mount Higashidate, giant slalom events in Alpine skiing and snowboarding were held. Kanbayashi Snowboard Park was the site of the half pipe events. The track is 120 meters long and 15 meters wide, with walls of 3.5 meters. 10,000 spectators can be accommodated at Kanbayashi.

The town of Iizuna, approximately 12 kilometers northwest of Nagano, was the site of freestyle skiing and bobsleigh, luge, and skeleton at Iizuna Kogen Ski Area. 8,000 spectators can watch the free style skiing on a course that 250 meters long and 12,000 can watch the jumps. The Spiral, which held the sledding events, was the first artificially refrigerated track in Asia. It is 1700 meters long, with a difference in height of 114 meters and 15 turns. At the Spiral, approximately 40,000 saplings, mainly beech and oak, were planted two per square meter, as part of the environmental stewardship committed during the Winter Games. The site can accommodate 10,000 spectators.

Finally, the town of Karuizawa, approximately 80 southwest of Nagano, hosted the curling events at Kazakoshi Park Arena. The venue was built as a multi-purpose venue. Its ice surface is 60 meters by 30. Its maximum capacity is 1,924 spectators. The town of Karuizawa also hosted the equestrian events at the 1964 Summer Olympics, thus becoming the first place in the world to host both the Summer Olympics and Winter Olympics.

Accommodation

To accommodate the athletes and officials during the Games, the Olympic Village was constructed in Imai district, approximately 7 kilometers south of Nagano Station. Along with the construction of the village, Imai Station was opened in 1997. The village was constructed by the city of Nagano as public residential housing, and loaned to the organizing committee during the Games. The Village occupies an area that is 19 hectares, composed of 23 buildings with a total of 1,032 apartments. Temporary restaurants and shops were also available during the Games. The Village was open from 24 January to 25 February 1998, and accommodated 3,200 people. Several prominent people were recognized as faces of the Olympic Village, including the Honorary Mayor Yasuko Konoe, Mayor Shozo Sasahara, and Deputy Mayors Takanori Kono, Hiroko Chiba, and Shun'ichi Bobby Hirai.

Because the curling arena was in Karuizawa, 90 kilometers away, a satellite village was built in Karuizawa, 7 kilometers from the arena. It was open from 4 to 16 February 1998. In addition, a section of the Shiga Kogen Prince Hotel, 58 kilometers from the Olympic Village, was reserved for 180 snowboarders and officials.

In addition to athletes and officials, members of the Olympic family and other personnel were housed in 900 hotels in Nagano and surrounding region, which represented 234,207 nights between 24 January to 25 February 1998. The members of the International Olympic Committee stayed athletes the Kokusai 21 Hotel in downtown Nagano. In total, the Olympic family included 18,350 people. Finally, two media villages were built in the districts of Yanagimachi, near Nagano Station, and Asahi, across the street from the M-Wave.

The Games

The Olympic torch relay

The Olympic torch was lit by sunlight during a ceremony organized by the Temple of Hera at Olympia, Greece on 19 December 1997. A Greek alpine skier started the relay towards Athens where a ceremony was held at the Panathenaic Stadium. On 22 December, the flame was transported to Japan by airplane. On 4 January, the 1998 Winter Olympics torch relay flame was divided into three parts in order for it to pass through every Japanese prefecture by three distinct routes: the Sea of Japan Route, the Pacific Route, and the Eastern Route. The start, on 6 January, was from Okinawa, Kagoshima, and Hokkaido. By 23 January, the relay had travelled through all 120 municipalities of Nagano Prefecture, and finally arrived in Nagano City on 5 February. The following day, after traveling through each district of the city, the relay arrived at the central square where three former athletes passed the flames to three members of the organizing committee. These three committee members then lit a torch held by Juan Antonio Samaranch. On 7 February, the flame travelled another 10 kilometers, and the figure skater Midori Ito lit the cauldron at Nagano Olympic Stadium during the opening ceremonies.

The Olympic Flame Relay in Japan was sponsored by Coca-Cola, lasted 33 days and travelled 1,162 kilometers. A group of 5.5 million people took part in relay activities. Over the distance of the relay, which was run or skied, the flame was always followed by a group of six people: the runner who carried the flame, some who accompanied the carrier, and four people in supporting roles, for a total of 6,901 people. In addition, each relay was followed by two groups of 11 vehicles and more than 20 people.

The shape of the torch represented a traditional Japanese torch called taimatsu. It was built with aluminum, was 55 centimeters long, and weighed 1.3 kilograms. The exterior of the torch was painted silver, to represent winter. Runners were blue and white uniforms symbolizing the color of the games and of snow. The runners' uniforms included logos for the Nagano Olympics and the Olympic Games, a logo of the relay, and of Coca-Cola.

Participating National Olympic Committees
72 nations participated in the 1998 Winter Olympic Games for a total of 2,176 athletes, of which 787 were female and 1,389 were male. With the addition of five countries and another 439 athletes since the 1994 Winter Olympic Games at Lillehammer, Norway, these were the largest Winter Olympics ever at the time. The nations of Azerbaijan, Kenya, Macedonia, Uruguay, and Venezuela participated in their first Winter Olympic Games. Iran returned to the Winter games after a 22-year absence, and North Korea, India, Ireland, and Yugoslavia returned after 6 years. Five countries, Fiji, Mexico, San Marino, American Samoa, and Senegal, which were at the 1994 Games, did not participate in 1998.

The United States had the largest athlete delegation with 186, followed by host Japan with 156, Canada with 144, and Germany with 125. Despite the large number of participating delegations, 40 of the 72 delegations had less than 10 athletes, with 12 nations having one sole athlete. 15 nations had between 11 and 50 athletes, 11 nations had between 51 and 100 athletes, and six nations had more than 101 athletes. Nations that participated in the ice hockey tournaments generally had the largest athlete delegations. With the exception of Norway and Switzerland, all 12 national delegations with 60 or more athletes participated in either or both of the female or male ice hockey tournaments.

The number in parentheses represents the number of athletes participating in official events.

Calendar

The 1998 Winter Olympics were held from Saturday, 7 February to Sunday, 22 February. This was 16 days and included three weekends. The number of events increased from 61 at the 1994 Winter Olympics to 68 in 1998. Two sports, curling and snowboarding were added to the program, as was women's ice hockey. This increased the number of sports to seven, and the number of disciplines to 14. The sporting program started and ended with ice hockey. The first matches started at 4:00 pm on 7 February featuring Kazakhstan defeating Italy 5–3, and Slovakia tying Austria 2–2. The final match was played on Sunday 22 February from 1:45 pm, and the Czech Republic defeated Russia 1–0.

Due to averse weather conditions, multiple events were delayed, including six alpine skiing races, snowboarding, and biathlon. Of these, the men's downhills was delayed five days.

All dates are in Japan Standard Time (UTC+9)

Ceremonies

Opening ceremony

The opening ceremony took place at Nagano Olympic Stadium, Nagano, Japan, on 7 February 1998. Japanese figure skater, Midori Ito, the first female skater to land seven triple jumps in a free skating competition, and the silver medalist at the 1992 Winter Olympics, lit the cauldron during the ceremony.

Seiji Ozawa, a Japanese conductor, directed an orchestra from five continents (Beijing, Berlin, Cape Town, New York, and Sydney - and the crowd in the Nagano Olympic Stadium), to perform the fourth movement of Beethoven's Symphony No. 9 (Ode to Joy). This was the first time a simultaneous international audio-visual performance had been achieved.

In all, 2,302 athletes from 72 countries and regions participated in the Games, including 814 female athletes and 1488 male athletes. Both the number of participating delegations and the number of athletes participating in the competition were, at the time, the most ever hosted at the Winter Olympics.

Medal ceremonies
The medal ceremonies for indoor events (skating, ice hockey, and curling) were held at the venues immediately after the finals, with the exception of the bronze medal presentations for the ice hockey events, which took place directly after the bronze medal matches. The Olympic Charter determines the outdoor events (skiing, biathlon, bobsleigh and luge), there was a simple ceremony in which bouquets of flowers were presented, and the medal ceremonies are held on Medals Plaza that was localizated at the Nagano City Central Square, approximately midway between Nagano Station and Zenkō-ji. A short fanfare of music was played, the athletes has positioned, and the medals, in the order of gold, silver, and bronze, were awarded. Finally, the national flags of the athletes were raised, and the national anthem of the winning athlete(s) was played. In all, 167,200 people attended the medal ceremonies, which were held at 7:00 p.m. each night. National and international artists presented every evening at the place before the medal presentations.

The gold, silver, and bronze medals each measured 80 mm in diameter and 9.7 mm in thickness. The gold medals weighed 256 g, the silver 250 g, and the bronze 230 g. On the front of the medals are borders of olive leaves, and in the center, a maki-e morning sun rises over a cloisonné emblem of the Nagano Olympics. On the reverse side, the snowflower emblem of the Games sits above a maki-e image of the mountains surrounding Nagano glowing in the morning sunrise. The initial lacquering was handcrafted by artisans from the region of Kiso, Nagano, and the medals were completed at the Mint Bureau of the Japanese Ministry of Finance.

In addition to the medals awarded to the athletes in each event, more than 19,000 commemorative medals were given to all athletes, officials, International Olympic Committee members, media personnel, volunteers and others. These medals, made by the Mint Bureau in cooperation with NAOC, were made from an alloy of 90% copper and 10% zinc. As the Olympic Charter also determines, diplomas, written in Japanese, French, and English, were given to the top eight finishers in each event, and every participant also received a commemorative diploma.

Closing ceremony

The closing ceremonies, like those of the opening, took place in the Nagano Olympic Stadium, with 60,000 spectators, including Akihito, the Emperor of Japan at the time, and his wife Empress Michiko. After the athletes entered, hundreds of drums were beat and a traditional hose and lion dance was presented. At the Antwerp Ceremony, Tasuku Tsukada, then mayor of Nagano presented the Olympic Flag to Deedee Corradini, then mayor of Salt Lake City, the host of the 2002 Winter Olympics, after this moment Juan Antonio Samaranch declared the games closed. This was followed by a performance from the Japanese singer Anri and the Olympic Cauldron was extinguished. The ceremony ended with the words "" ("Goodbye, Thank you") and a major fireworks performance accompanied by the song: "Ile Aiye" or "Let's Make a Circle and Dance" performed by Japanese pop group Agharta.

Medal table

In all, 24 of the 72 participating nations at these Games won at least one medal, as shown in the table below. A total of 15 countries won at least one gold medal and 18 nations won two or more medals. In total, 205 medals were distributed. Germany finished on top of the table with 29 medals, including 12 gold, nine silver, and eight bronze. Germany, which finished in third place in the medal standings at the 1994 Winter Olympics, won most of its medals in Alpine skiing, speed skating, and luge, in which it won all three gold medals. German female athletes won 22 of the country's 29 medals. Norway finished in second, as in 1994, with 25 medals, including nine won in cross-country skiing and five in biathlon. Russia, which finished atop the medals standing in 1994, finished in third in 1998, with 9 gold medals, including the five gold at the stake on the women's cross-country skiing. Canada moved from a discret seventh in 1994 to fourth in 1998 with 6 gold medals, and the United States remained in fifth place. Netherlands finished in 6th place, 12 places higher than in 1994 and their domination at the speed skating started with 5 gold medals. Host Japan beat its previous record of medals at a Winter Games, with 10 medals, including respectable 5 gold medals. Australia became the second country from the Southern Hemisphere to win a medal, a bronze in alpine skiing. Also, Denmark each won your first ever medal, the silver at women's curling. In addition, Bulgaria and the Czech Republic each won their first gold medals at a Winter Olympics in women's biathlon and men's ice hockey respectively. Finally, Kazakhstan won its first medal from a female athlete.

Podium sweeps

Sports
The 1998 Winter Olympics featured 68 medal events over 14 disciplines in seven sports. This was an increase from 61 events in 12 disciplines across six sports from the 1994 Winter Olympics. Curling was the additional sport, snowboarding was an additional discipling in skiing, and women's ice hockey was added to the ice hockey program.

Biathlon

The biathlon competitions took place at Nozawa Onsen Snow Resort, north of Nagano City. The six events were the sprint, individual, and relay, for both men and women. In all, 183 athletes took part, including 96 men and 87 women from 32 countries. Norway and Germany each won five medals, with Uschi Disl from the latter country winning one gold, one silver, and one bronze.

The first event was the women's 15 km individual race that took place in falling snow on 9 February. The surprise gold medalist was Ekaterina Dafovska from Bulgaria, who had been ranked 51st at the previous Biathlon World Cup. Her gold medal was the first-ever Bulgarian gold medal at a Winter Olympics. Her time was 54:52.0, with only one target missed. Olena Petrova from Ukraine won the silver, 17.8 seconds behind, and Uschi Disl won the bronze, 25.9 seconds behind Dafovska.

The first men's event, the 20 km individual race, took place on 11 February. The Norwegian Halvard Hanevold missed his second-last target, but finished first in a time of 56:16.4. The Italian Pieralberto Carrara, who missed no targets, target, won the silver, 5.05 seconds behind. The Belarusian Alexei Aidarov was 30.1 seconds behind the Norwegian, and won the bronze.

Bobsleigh

The bobsleigh competitions took place at the Spiral, in Iizuna, just north of Nagano City. The Spiral course measured 1700 m in length, with fifteen curves, descended 113 m from start to finish, and included two short uphill sections. The two events were the two-man and four-man, for men only. Female competitors would begin competing in the two woman events at the subsequent Winter Olympics, the 2002 Winter Olympics in Salt Lake City.

In all, 156 athletes took part from 28 countries. The bobsleigh events resulted in two ties, for the two-man gold and for the four-man bronze. This was the first time in Olympic bobsleigh history that there were ties for the medal positions. Christoph Langen and Markus Zimmermann won bronze in the two-man competition and were part of the winning four-man team. In all, Germany win one gold and one bronze; Italy and Canada also won one gold each when the two-man team. Six team in all won medals. The first time since the 1968 Winter Olympics did more than four countries win bobsleigh medals. In addition, Germany and Switzerland were the only two countries to place two sleds in the top ten of either event.

The 1996 and 1997 Bobsleigh World Champions were teams from Germany and Italy respectively. However, Günther Huber and Antonio Tartaglia from Italy tied with the two-man team from Canada, Pierre Lueders: and Dave MacEachern for the gold medal, each with combined times of 3:37.24. No silver medal was awarded. The German team of Christoph Langen and Markus Zimmermann were 0.65 seconds behind, and were awarded the bronze.

In the four-man event, bad weather restricted the competition to three runs only. The German team of Christoph Langen, Markus Zimmermann, Marco Jakobs and Olaf Hampel completed the three runs in 2:39.41 for the gold medal. The Swiss team of Marcel Rohner, Markus Nüssli, Markus Wasser, and Beat Seitz finished second with a time of 2:40.01. Two teams, were awarded bronze medals after completing the three runs in 2:40.06. These were the team from Great Britain, made up of Sean Olsson, Dean Ward, Courtney Rumbolt, and Paul Attwood; and the team from France, composed of Bruno Mingeon, Emmanuel Hostache, Éric Le Chanony, and Max Robert.

Curling

Curling was included in the program for the Nagano Olympics in 1993 following discussions that had begun in 1992. At the time, it was considered that curling was making its official Olympic debut following its appearance as a demonstration sport at the 1932, 1988, and 1992. At the Games in Nagano, both the men's and the women's curling tournament took place at Kazakoshi Park Arena in Karuizawa, Nagano, 30 minutes by bullet train (shinkansen) south of Nagano City. Eight teams played a total of seven games in the round robin in both tournaments, with the four best teams going to the semifinals. Canada won gold in the women's competition and silver in the men's; Switzerland won the gold in the men's tournament.

In the men's tournament, the Mike Harris team from Canada easily completed the round-robin tournament winning six of its seven games, only losing to the Eigil Ramsfjell team from Norway. In the semi-finals, the Canadian team defeated Tim Somerville's team from the United States by a score of 7–1; and in the other semi-final, the team from Switzerland led by Patrick Hürlimann defeated Norway 8–7. In the gold medal game, Switzerland shocked Canada by winning 9–3. In the bronze medal game, Eigil Ramsfjell's team from Norway defeated Tim Somerville's USA team by a score of 9–4.

In the women's tournament, the Sandra Schmirler team from Canada and the Elisabet Gustafson team from Sweden easily completed the round-robin tournament, with both teams winning six of their seven games. Canada only lost to the Dordi Nordby team from Norway, and Sweden's only loss was to Canada. In the semi-finals, the Canadian team defeated the team led by Kirsty Hay representing team Great Britain by a score of 6–5; and in the other semi-final, the team from Denmark led by Helena Blach Lavrsen defeated Sweden 7–5. In the gold medal game, Canada defeated Denmark by a score of 7–5. In the bronze medal game, Elisabet Gustafso's team from Sweden defeated Kirsty Hay's GB team by a score of 10–6.

Ice hockey

The ice hockey matches took place at two purpose-built arenas in Nagano City, Big Hat and Aqua Wing Arena. The ice hockey events were significant for two reasons: the first Olympic ice hockey tournament for women and the participation of players from the NHL. The Czech Republic defeated Russia in the gold medal game for the men's final, and Americans defeated Canadians in the gold medal game for the women's final.

The men's competition began on 7 February with eight teams playing in two groups of four, Group A and B, with each team playing three games. The winners of these two groups, Kazakhstan and Belarus, advanced to join Groups C and D, composed of the six highest ranked men's national ice hockey teams in the world. Russia, Czech Republic, and Finland were joined by Kazakhstan in Group C; Canada, Sweden, and USA were joined by Belarus in Group D. On 22 February, with 10,010 spectators in attendance at Big Hat, the Czech Republic defeated Russia in the gold medal game for the men's final, 1–0, with the lone goal of the match scored with 12 minutes remaining. Finland defeated Canada for the bronze medal by a score of 3–2.

The first women's ice hockey world championship, a biennial tournament, took place in 1990. Discussions to include women's ice hockey at the 1998 games began in 1992, and it was decided to include them in the program in 1993. The tournament included six teams playing in a one-group round-robin tournament. The top two team advanced to the gold medal game, and the teams ranked third and fourth played in the bronze medal match. The favorites were the Canadians, who had won the three previous world championships, with the Americans finishing second each time. In the round-robin tournament, the Americans finished first, with the Canadians second. In the last round-robin game, the Americans handily defeated the Canadians, 7–4, with the two teams scoring nine goals in the third period. In the gold medal match, with 8,626 fans in attendance at Big Hat, the Americans defeated the Canadians 3–1. Team Finland defeated Team China 4–1 for the bronze medal.

Luge

The luge competitions took place in Iizuna, Nagano, at the Spiral (Nagano Bobsleigh-Luge Park), the first purpose-built permanent bobsleigh, luge, and skeleton track in Asia. In all, 24 nations took part in the luge events, with four countries, India, South Korea, New Zealand, and Venezuela making their Olympic debut in luge events. There were three events, men's single, women's single, and doubles. Germany won all three gold medals, one silver, and one bronze. The United States won one silver and one bronze. Italy and Austria rounded out the medal table.

The first event with 24 lugers was the men's singles. Each athlete completed four runs over two days, 8 and 9 February. The German athlete, Georg Hackl, who had won gold at the 1992 Winter Olympics and 1994 Winter Olympics, had entered the competition winless in the 1997–1998 season. Hackl raced in a newly designed luge and aerodynamic shoes. Several team protested but these protests were rejected. Hackl dominated all four races, and finished with a time of 3:18.436, half a second ahead of the Italian Armin Zöggeler. Zöggeler finished .154 seconds ahead of Jens Müller of Germany, who had won gold at the 1988 Winter Olympics when he competed for East Germany.

On 10 and 11 February, the women's singles event took place, with each athlete completing four runs. In all, 29 athletes took part. The race for gold was very tight between two German athletes, Silke Kraushaar and Barbara Niedernhuber, with Kraushaar winning by .002 seconds, with a total time of 3:23.779 – the smallest margin of victory ever at the Olympics. Angelika Neuner of Austria won the bronze, 0.474 seconds behind the gold medalist.

The two-race doubles competition, which in theory were open to females, consisted of 17 male pairs. The event took place 13 February. The Germans Stefan Krauße and Jan Behrendt, who had competed together for 14 years, won the gold medal with a time of 1:41.105. Two American teams won silver and bronze, with Chris Thorpe and Gordy Sheer finishing .022 seconds behind the gold medalists and Brian Martin and Mark Grimmette a further .09 seconds behind. The win by Krauße and Behrendt was their 
four medal at the Olympics since they won silver at the 1988 Winter Olympics when they competed for East Germany. This was the first time since the introduction of luge at the 1964 Winter Olympics that athletes other than those from Austria, Germany, Italy, and the Soviet Union won medals.

Skating

Figure skating

The figure skating events took place at the White Ring (arena), an indoor arena built for the Games in Nagano City. Medals were awarded in four events: men's and women's singles, pair skating, and ice dance. The pairs event took place from 8–10 February, followed by the men's singles from 12 to 14 February, the ice dance from 13 to 16 February, and the women's singles from 18 to 20 February. The exhibition gala took place on 21 February. Russia won five medals, including three gold and two silver. The USA won one gold and one silver. France won two bronze medals. Canada won one silver, with China and Germany each winning one bronze. American figure skater Tara Lipinski became the youngest competitor in Winter Olympics history to earn a gold medal in an individual event.

Short track speed skating

Six short track speed skating events took place at the White Ring (arena) from 17 to 21 February. A total of 18 nations were representing among the skaters. Four countries won medals. South Korea won six medals, including three gold. Canada won four medals, including two gold. Host Japan won one gold and one silver; and China won five silver and one bronze medal.

The 14th ranked Japanese skater Takafumi Nishitani beat the Olympic record in the 500m semi-finals. In the final, he led from the start and won the gold medal with a time of 42.862 seconds. The Canadian Marc Gagnon, who was in second place, fell with two laps remaining. The Chinese skater An Yulong won the silver with a time of 43.022, 0.5 seconds of the Japanese skater Hitoshi Uematsu. In the 1000 meters, world record holder Marc Gagnon was disqualified for obstruction in the quarter-finals. The Chinese skater Li Jiajun, who led for most of the final, was passed by the South Korean skater, Kim Dong-sung, in the final corner. Kim won with a time of 1:32.375, 0.053 seconds ahead of the silver medalist. The Canadian Éric Bédard won the bronze, .223 seconds further behind. In the 5000m relays, world-title holders from Italy led at the beginning of the relay but were passed by the Canadians, and fell. With about one-quarter of the race left, a Chinese skater fell, bringing down with him a South Korean skater, allowing the Canadians to easily win the gold, with a time of 7:06.075. The South Koreans were .701 seconds behind, with the Chinese finishing with the bronze a further 4 seconds back. The Japanese team won the B-Final with a time that was five seconds faster than the gold medalists.

In the women's 500m final, the Canadian Isabelle Charest collided with the Chinese Wang Chunlu, and both fell. Charest was disqualified and Wang, angry, never finished the race.  The Canadian Annie Perreault won the gold with a time of 46.568 seconds, 0.059 seconds ahead of Yang Yang (S) of China. Because these were the only two to finish the race, the bronze medal went to the winner of the B-Final, the South Korean Chun Lee-kyung. In the 1000m race, the Chinese skater Yang Yang (A) led the race but was passed by the 500m bronze medalist, Chun, in the last straight away to the finish line. Chun won the race with a time of 1:42.776 seconds. Yang Yang (A) was disqualified for using her elbow to try to block Chun. Yang Yang (S) won the silver, 0.567 seconds behind the gold medalist from South Korea. Won Hye-kyung, also of South Korea, won the bronze a further 0.18 seconds behind. In the 3000m relay, the Chinese team led for most of the race but the South Korean skater Kim Yun-mi passed Yang Yang (A) in the last changeover. Both teams beat the World Record, with the South Koreans finishing with a time of 4:16.260, and the Chinese were 0.123 seconds behind. The Canadian team won bronze with a time of 4:21.205.

Speed skating

From 8–20 February 171 athletes from 25 countries took part in the long-track speed skating events that were held in Nagano City at M-Wave, Japan's first indoor, long-track speed skating venue. In all, eight countries won medals. The Netherlands won 11 medals, including five gold and four silver. Canada, host Japan, and the USA also won multiple medals. Twelve Olympic records and five World records were established at the Games on the ice at M-Wave. Gianni Romme and Marianne Timmer, both of the Netherlands, each won two gold medals. The Nagano Olympics were the first where athletes wore clap skates.

On the men's side, the world record holder in the men's 500m was the Japanese skater Hiroyasu Shimizu. Shimizu was the smallest skater at the Games, 1.62m tall. The 500m was run over two races for the first time at these Games. Shimizu was fastest in both races becoming only the second ever Japanese to win a singles title at the Olympic Games. Finishing in second and third were the Canadian skaters, Jeremy Wotherspoon and Kevin Overland, who are 1.91m and 1.84 m tall, respectively. Shimizu's combined time was 1:11.35, 0.49 seconds ahead of Wotherspoon, and another 0.02 seconds ahead of Overland. The 1500m was won by Norwegian Ådne Søndrål with a world record time of 1:47.87. Søndrål was 0.26 and 0.65 seconds ahead of two Dutch skaters, Ids Postma, and Rintje Ritsma. In the 1000m, Postma won gold, with a time of 1:10.64, followed by another Dutch skater Jan Bos, who was 0.07 seconds behind, and Shimizu who won the bronze with a time of 1:11.00. In the 5000m, the Dutch skater Gianni Romme won gold, with a world record time of 6:22.20, followed by Ritsma, who was 6.04 seconds behind, and Bart Veldkamp, representing Belgium who won the bronze with a time of 6:28.31. Finally, in the 10,000m, three Dutch skaters won medals. Romme won gold with a world record time, 15 seconds ahead of the world record, of 13:15.33, Bob de Jong won silver, and Ritsma won bronze.

On the women's side, the 500 m title was won by the Canadian Catriona Le May Doan, the favorite, who beat or equalled the world record four times before the Games. Her teammate, Susan Auch, finished second. Both were coached by Susan's brother, Derrick Auch. Tomomi Okazaki, of host Japan, won the bronze medal. In the 1500m, Dutch skater Marianne Timmer won gold with a world record time of 1:57.58. The German skater Gunda Niemann was second, 1.08 seconds behind, and the American skater Chris Witty won bronze with a time of 1:58.97. In the 1000m, Timmer won gold again, with a time of 1:16.51. Witty won silver, 0.26 seconds behind, and Le May Doan won bronze with a time of 1:17.37. The German skater Franziska Schenk, one of the favorites, fell during the second lap. In the 3000m, German skaters won all three medals. Niemann won gold with a time of 4:07.29; Claudia Pechstein won silver, 1.18 seconds back; and Anni Friesinger won bronze with a time of 4:09.44. Finally, in the 5000m, Pechstein won gold with a world record time of 6:59.61; Niemann was 0.04 seconds back for silver, and the Kazakh skater Lyudmila Prokasheva won bronze, with a time of 7:11.14. Prokasheva's medal was the first medal by a female Kazakh athlete at any Winter Olympics.

Skiing

Alpine skiing

The Alpine skiing events took place at Hakuba Happoone Winter Resort in Hakuba village, 50 kilometers west of Nagano City, and at Mount Higashidate in the Shiga Highlands in Yamanouchi, Nagano, 30 kilometers northeast of Nagano City. In all, 249 athletes, 141 males and 108 females, from 49 countries, took part in the 10 Alpine skiing events, men's and women's downhill, Super-G, Giant Slalom, Slalom, and Combined. Austria won 11 medals, including three gold. Germany also won three gold, and six medals in total. Seven other countries also won medals, including Australia, whose Zali Steggall won that countries first ever individual Winter Olympics medal. The most successful athletes at these Games were Katja Seizinger from Germany, who won two gold medals and one bronze; and Hermann Maier, from Austria, who won two gold medals.

Cross-country skiing

The cross-country skiing events took place at Nozawa Onsen Ski Resort, in the town of Nozawaonsen, approximately 50 kilometers north of Nagano. In all, 228 athletes, including 126 men and 102 women, from 37 countries took part. Russia won eight medals, including five gold medals, and Norway won nine medals, including four gold medals. Six other countries also won medals, including Finland with one gold and two bronze, and Italy with two silver and two bronze. Larisa Lazutina from Russia won five medals, including three gold; and Bjørn Dæhlie from Norway won four medals, including three gold.

Freestyle skiing

The freestyle skiing competition was held at the Iizuna Kogen Ski Area, 12 kilometers north of Nagano, from 8 to 18 February. It was the third consecutive Games that freestyle skiing events took place. The four events, men's and women's moguls and aerials, involved 110 athletes from 25 countries . The United States won three gold medals. Host Japan won one gold medal. Athletes from Finland won a silver and a bronze medal. Six other countries took home either one silver or one bronze medal.

In men's moguls, the American Jonny Moseley was first after the qualifications. Two cousins from Finland, Janne Lahtela and Sami Mustonen, who had never medalled at the FIS Freestyle Ski World Cup, were ranked second and third behind Moseley. Moseley easily won the final with a score of 26.93. Lahtela was .93 points behind, and Mustonen was another .24 points behind. The Canadian, Jean-Luc Brassard, gold medalist from the 1994 Winter Olympics, finished in fourth. In men's aerials, the American Eric Bergoust, who had fallen during training, overtook the other competitors with a score of 255.64 points. The Frenchmen, Sébastien Foucras, and the Belarusian, Dmitri Dashinski, were second and third. The Canadian, Nicolas Fontaine, world champion in 1997, only managed 10th place after falling on his second jump.

The Japanese moguls skier, Tae Satoya, 11th after qualifications, surprised everyone by winning the gold medal with a score of 25.06. She was the first female Japanese Olympic champion. The German, Tatjana Mittermayer scored 24.62 points and won the silver medal.  The Norwegian, Kari Traa, won the bronze with a score of 24.09 points. In women's aerials, American Nikki Stone won the gold medal with a score of 193.00 points. The ex-gymnast, Xu Nannan from China won silver with a score of 186.97, and Colette Brand from Switzerland won bronze with a score of 171.83.

Nordic combined skiing

The Nordic combined events were held at the Hakuba Ski Jumping Stadium and the Snow Harp, both in Hakuba village, 50 kilometers west of Nagano City. In all, 53 athletes from 14 countries, took part in the two events, individual and team. Norway won both gold medals. Finland won both silver medals. France and Russia each won one of the bronze medals.

The first event was the individual competition that took place on 13 and 14 February. In all, there were 48 athletes. The silver medalist from the 1994 Winter Olympics, the Norwegian Bjarte Engen Vik, was the 1997–98 FIS Nordic Combined World Cup leader. At the Hakuba Ski Jumping Stadium, Vik led after the first two jumps. He was followed by the Russian Valeri Stoliarov. The following day, the skiers left, in order of the placement following the ski jump, along te 15 kilometer cross-country race at the Snow Harp. The race was skied in the rain. Vik led throughout and finished with a 27.5 second lead over second place. With three kilometers to the finish line, the Finnish athlete, 18-year-old Samppa Lajunen, who was sixth after the jumps, caught up with Stoliarov. The skied together until the stadium, and 60 meters from the finish line, Lajunen passed the Russian and picked up the silver medal 0.7 seconds ahead of Stoliarov who won the bronze. The fastest athlete on the course was the Swiss skier, Marco Zarucchi, who was 43rd after the jumps, finished in 25th place.

Eleven nations took part in the team event on 19 and 20 February. At previous Olympics, the team event involved three athletes per team, with the completing a 3x10 kilometer relay. At Nagano, the team was enlarged to four athletes who completed a 4x5 kilometer relay. After the jumps, the team from Finland led by four seconds ahead of the Austrians, eight seconds ahead of the Norwegians, nine ahead of the Czechs, and 29 seconds ahead of the Japanese. The relay took place in rain. The Norwegians quickly took the lead and never looked back. The last Norwegian skier had the time to grab his country's flag with 500 meters from the finish line, and they won gold with more than one minute lead over the team from Finland. The French team, sixth after the jumps, won the bronze medal ahead of the Austrians. The Japanese, gold medalists at the 1992 Winter Olympics and 1994 Winter Olympics finished in fifth.

Ski jumping

The ski jumping competitions took place at the Hakuba Ski Jumping Stadium in Hakuba village, 50 kilometers west of Nagano City. In all, 68 athletes from 19 countries participated. For the first time, the top 30 jumpers qualified for the second round. Host Japan won the most medals, including two gold in the large hill and large hill team. Finland, Germany, and Austria rounded out the medal table. Kazuyoshi Funaki from Yoichi, Hokkaido in Japan won two gold and one silver for the host country.

The normal hill jumps took place on 11 February in front of 45,000 spectators. The Japanese, who had dominated the 1997–98 FIS Ski Jumping World Cup season, were the favorites. With a jump of 91.5 meters, Masahiko Harada led after the first round ahead of the Finnish jumper, Jani Soininen
Kazuyoshi Funaki, who was fourth after the first round, took the lead with a jump of 90.5 meters in the second round. After a delay caused by strong wind, Soininen took the lead with only Harada still to jump. A sidewind blew when Harada jumped, and only managed 84.5 meters to finish in fifth place overall. Soininen won gold with 234.5 points, Funaki was second with 233.5, and the Austrian Andreas Widhölzl finished third with 232.5 points.

On 15 February, the large hill jump competition took place. 60,000 spectators gathered at Hakuba Ski Jumping Stadium. Normal hill bronze medalist Widhölzl led after the first round, ahead of the Japanese jumper Takanobu Okabe, Jani Soininen et Funaki. In the second round, Funaki jumped 132.5 m, and, for the first time at the Olympics, received perfect points for his style. He jumped into first place and won the gold medal with 272.3 points overall. It was the first Japanese gold medal in ski jumping since the 1972 Winter Olympics in Sapporo. Harada jumped next. Unfortunately, the measurement system was installed between 95 and 135 meters and his jump was beyond that. He was measured manually to be 136 meters. He also had good points but only managed to win the bronze medal with 258.3. meters. Soininen won the silver with a combined score of 260.8 points.

At the 1994 Winter Olympics, the Japanese team were the favorites but Harada jumped poorly, costing the Japanese the gold medal. Again, in 1998, the Japanese were the favorites. The team event took place on 17 February. The start was slowed by 30 minutes because of heavy falling snow. The first two Japanese jumpers, Okabe at Hiroya Saitō, jumped Japan into first place. Harada completely missed his jump, jumping only 79.5 meters, and despite Funaki having a good jump, Japan drop from first to fourth after the first round behind Austria, Germany, and Norway. Okabe jumped 137 meters, which was an Olympic record. Saitō followed this with a good jump. Harada was next, and like Okabe, jumped 137 meters. The last jumper was Funaki who jumped 125 meters, and the Japanese team became Olympic champions with 933.0 points. The Germans won silver with 897.4 points, and the Austrians finished with 881.5 points for the bronze.

Snowboarding

In the decade leading up the games, snowboarding had become popular in both North America and Europe, as well as Japan, and as a result, in August 1994, the NAOC received a request from the IOC president Samaranch to consider including snowboarding at the 1998 Winter Olympics. To reduce costs, NAOC asked the host community to cover a portion of the costs – the town Yamanouchi agreed – and FIS was expected to support financially as well. In November 1995, the NAOC executive board agreed to add snowboarding, and this was approved by the IOC at their December meeting the following month in Karuizawa. This was the first Winter Olympics with snowboarding events. The events took place at Mount Yakebitai and Kanbayashi Snowboard Park in Yamanouchi, Nagano, 30 kilometers northeast of Nagano City, from 8 to 12 February. In all, 125 athletes from 22 countries participated in the men's and women's Halfpipe and Giant slalom. Athletes from Germany won two medals, including one gold. Athletes from Switzerland, France, and Canada also won gold medals.

In the men's giant slalom, the Canadian Jasey-Jay Anderson won the first race with a half-second lead ahead of Rebagliati. During the second race, the event was temporary delayed because of snow and fog. Ross Rebagliati finished with a combined time of 2:03.96, 0.02 seconds ahead of the Italian Thomas Prugger, and another 0.10 seconds ahead of the Swiss Ueli Kestenholz. Controversy occurred when three days after the men's Giant Slalom, the International Olympic Committee determined that gold medalist Rebagliati from Canada, was disqualified after testing positive for marijuana. It was the first time in Olympic history that an athlete was disqualified for marijuana. The Canadian Olympic Committee lodged a protest and the case quickly went to the Court of Arbitration for Sport where it was ruled that because marijuana was not classified as a "banned" substance, the medal should be returned to the Canadian athlete. In the halfpipe, the gold medal went to the Swiss Gian Simmen, who had the highest score, 85.2, despite a heavy rain. The Norwegian Daniel Franck won the silver with a score of 82.4, and the American Ross Powers won the bronze with a score of 82.1.

The women's giant slalom was delayed one day because of a snowstorm. The big favorite, the Frenchwoman Karine Ruby won the first race with almost two seconds ahead of her compatriot Isabelle Blanc. Ruby won the second race, with Blanc missing the last gate and falling. Ruby's combined time was 2:17.34. The German Heidi Renoth won the silver with a time of 2:19.17, and the Austrian Brigitte Köck won the bronze with a time of 2:19.42. In the halfpipe, the Norwegian Stine Brun Kjeldaas won the qualification round. However, in the finals, the German Nicola Thost, a former gymnast, finished second in both legs, scored 74.6 points, which was enough for the gold medal. Stine Brun Kjeldaas finished fourth in the first leg and first in second, winning the silver with 74.2 points. The American Shannon Dunn-Downing won the first leg, but finished seventh in the second leg, leaving her with the bronze with a score of 72.8.

Mascots

The mascots of the 1998 Winter Olympics are four owls named Sukki, Nokki, Lekki and Tsukki, also known as the Snowlets.

Media
The Nagano Olympics were covered by more than 10,000 members of the media, including 8,329 accredited journalists, of which 2,586 were from newspaper media and 5,743 television and radio journalists. The Organizing Committee established Main Press Center (MPC, over two buildings, and 17 annexes throughout the different sites.

The MPC, which is today the Wakasato Civic Cultural Hall, was built beside Big Hat, the main ice hockey venue. The MPC had a surface area of 42,728 m2, with one principal room for 600 journalists of 1430m2 and another of 5100m2 that was rented by various press agencies. The largest press offices at the Games were Kyodo News, Associated Press, Agence France-Presse, Reuters, and Deutsche Presse-Agentur. The MPC also included a press conference room for 600 people.

The host broadcaster for the Games, the Olympic Radio and Televisions Organization (ORTO'98) was established as a separate organization within NAOC, the organizing committee. ORTO'98 was created between NHK, the Japanese national broadcaster, the National Association of Broadcasters (NAB), and NAOC. A total of 1647 staff worked 386 cameras at the various venues and events, with coverage increasing by 55% over the 1994 Winter Olympics in Lillehammer. The Games were broadcast in 160 countries, 40 more than in Lillehammer, and it was estimated that 10.7 billion viewers watched the Games over the 16-day period. Some events were filmed and broadcast in analog high-definition television, with NHK broadcasting over 270 hours of coverage in Japan.

Broadcasting rights totaled 513 million US dollars, which was a record for the Winter Olympics, and all contracts with 16 broadcasting rights' holders were record sums. This money was split 60–40 between NAOC and the International Olympic Committee. The American broadcasting network, CBS, paid 375 million US dollars, to distribute the Games in the United States. This would be the last Olympic Games so far to not air on NBC in the US, as they acquired the exclusive rights to both the summer and winter games beginning in 2000.

Broadcasting rights

Asia – ABU, ATV
Australia – Seven Network, Fox Sports
Canada – CBC
Europe – EBU
Jamaica – CVM TV
Japan – NOJC
Malaysia – Astro
New Zealand – TVNZ
North Africa – URTNA
South Africa – SABC
South Korea – KBS
South America – OTI
Sub-Saharan Africa – Supersport
United Kingdom – BBC 
United States – CBS

See also
 1998 Winter Olympics flu epidemic

References
Notes

Citations

External links

 
  Downloadable PDF: Volume 1 , Volume 2, Volume 3, Appendix, retrieved on 17 January 2010.
 1998 Winter Olympics Official website

 
Winter Olympics
Olympic Games in Japan
Winter Olympics by year
1998 in multi-sport events
Sports competitions in Nagano (city)
February 1998 sports events in Asia
Winter sports competitions in Japan